The 1856 Grand National was the 18th renewal of the Grand National horse race that took place at Aintree near Liverpool, England, on 27 February 1856. The race was won by Freetrader. This was the first of five times that George Stevens rode the winner of the Grand National.

This was the last time that the race was held in February.

Finishing Order

Non-finishers

References

 1856
Grand National
Grand National
19th century in Lancashire
February 1856 events